Dutch Brazilians refers to Brazilians of full or partial Dutch ancestry. Dutch Brazilians are mainly descendants of immigrants from the Netherlands.

The Dutch were among the first Europeans settling in Brazil during the 17th century. They controlled the northern coast of Brazil from 1630 to 1654. A significant number of Dutch immigrants arrived in that period. The state of Pernambuco (then Captaincy of Pernambuco) was once a colony of the Dutch Republic from 1630 to 1661. There are a considerable number of people who are descendants of the Dutch colonists in Paraíba (for example in Frederikstad, today João Pessoa - the second most Dutch city in Brazil on XVII century, after Mauristaadt), Pernambuco, Alagoas and Rio Grande do Norte.

During the 19th and 20th century, Dutch immigrants from the Netherlands immigrated to the Brazil's Center-South, founded a few cities and prospered. The majority of Dutch Brazilians reside in Espírito Santo, Paraná, Rio Grande do Sul, Pernambuco and São Paulo. There are also small groups of Dutch Brazilians in Goiás, Ceará, Rio Grande do Norte, Mato Grosso do Sul, Minas Gerais and Rio de Janeiro.

Dutch presence in Brazil

The first synagogue in the Americas, Kahal Zur Israel Synagogue - was established by the Dutch  in Recife in 1636.

Colonial reports stated that there was a strong rate of miscegenation between Amerindians, Portuguese, Blacks, Jews, Dutch, Germans, French and Englishmen during the period of the Dutch Brazil colony. The majority of soldiers and marines who lived in the Nieuw-Holland were Dutch, Germans, Norwegians, Scottish and Jews. The absence of women in the colony explained the high rate of mixed race people.

In 2000, a genetic study among white Brazilians showed that 19% of people born in the Northeast had a genetic marker for chromosome Y that is common in Europe (haplogroup 2 - corresponding today to the sum of haplogroups I, G an J). This shows an excess of 6% when compared to Portugal (13%). The other Brazilian region which also has a higher frequency than Portugal is the South Region (28%). According to the research, the excess in both regions could be explained as due to the strong European immigration in the South Region and the Dutch presence in the Northeast. Another study showed a higher contribution of European ancestry in chromosome Y among people from the Northeast Region, Brazil (94,74%) when compared with samples from Southeast Brazil (85,88% - 88,1%).

The second wave 

The first Dutch immigrants to Brazil settled in Espírito Santo state from 1858 to 1862, establishing Holanda, a settlement. This settlement of five hundred primarily Reformed folk from West Zeelandic Flanders in the province of Zeeland was not successful. All further immigration came to an end and contacts with the homeland declined. In 1973, the "lost settlement" was rediscovered in 1973. Except for the Zeeuwen in Holanda, not many Dutch went to Brazil until post-1900. Between 1906 and 1913 more than 3,500 Dutch  emigrated there, primarily during 1908 and 1909.

After the Second World War, the Dutch Organization of Catholic Farmers and Vegetable Growers (KNBTB) coordinated a new flow of Dutch immigrants in search for a new life and new opportunities in Brazil. The most known Dutch settlements in Brazil are Holambra I and Holambra II (because they became leading producers of flowers), but other settlements were established as well, and in time these small villages became cities.

Also arrived after Second World War were Eurasian refugees of mixed Indonesian and Dutch blood called Indos. These Indos traveled to Brazil because the Dutch society did not consider their war experience in Indonesia, and did not recognize the European status the Indos held dearly in their mother country. The number of Indos in Brazil was never counted because they are a part of the overall Dutch-Brazilian population.

Colony of Holambra

Holambra is a municipality in São Paulo. The colony Holambra (from the words Holland-America-Brazil) and The Cooperativa Agropecuária de Holambra (Cattle Farming Cooperation of Holambra) were founded in 1948 by Catholic Dutch immigrants at the farm Fazenda Ribeirão, between the cities of Jaguariúna, Santo Antônio de Posse, Artur Nogueira and Cosmópolis. After a referendum in 1991 where 98% of the population voted in favor of political autonomy for the area, Holambra gained city status in January 1993.

The cows that were shipped in from the Netherlands by the initial colonists did not survive the heat and tropical diseases and so the colonists diversified to pig and chicken farming. As the colony around the farm grew in the following decades, the focus shifted from agriculture to horticulture. Famous for its large production of flowers and plants and for the yearly event Expoflora, Holambra receives tens of thousands of tourists each year. In April 1998, that fact was recognized as Holambra gained the status of Estância Turística, touristic location.

Notable Dutch Brazilians
Dutch-descended families in Brazil are used to be celebrated in politics and culture:

Aurélio Buarque de Holanda Ferreira - lexicographer, philologist and translator
Bebel Gilberto - singer and composer
Chico Buarque - singer, musician, composer, writer and poet
David Neeleman - businessman
Gilberto Freyre - cultural anthropologist, historian, journalist and congressman
Djavan - singer and composer
João Maurício Vanderlei, Baron of Cotejipe - former Prime Minister of Brazil
José Wilker - actor and director
Lobão - singer, songwriter, multi-instrumentalist and writer 
Mariana Ximenes - actress
Nelson Piquet Jr. - racing driver

See also

 Dutch Brazil
 Dutch people
 White Brazilians

References

External links
 Dutch Association of Rio de Janeiro 
 Dutch Society of São Paulo 

Brazil
Brazil
European Brazilian